The 2017–18 Washington Wizards season was the 57th season of the franchise in the National Basketball Association (NBA) and 45th in the Washington, D.C. area. The Wizards played their home games at newly named Capital One Arena.

They finished the regular season with a record of 43–39, which clinched the 8th seed. In the playoffs, the Wizards faced the top-seeded Toronto Raptors in the First Round, and lost in 6 games.

Until 2021, This season marked the last time the Wizards made the playoffs.

Previous season 
The Wizards finished the 2016–17 season 49–33 to finish in first place in the Southeast Division. They received the No. 4 seed in the Eastern Conference playoffs where they defeated the Atlanta Hawks in the first round of the playoffs, winning the series 4–2. In the Conference semifinals, they were defeated 4–3 by the Boston Celtics.

Offseason

Draft picks

The Wizards did not select anyone in the draft, having traded both picks earlier in the year.
 The Wizards traded their first-round pick (No. 22 overall) to the Brooklyn Nets on February 22, along with Andrew Nicholson and Marcus Thornton, in exchange for both Bojan Bogdanović and Chris McCullough.
 The Wizards traded their second-round pick (No. 52 overall) to the New Orleans Pelicans on June 21 (the night before the NBA Draft), in exchange for Tim Frazier.

Roster

Standings

Division

Conference

Game log

Preseason

|- style="background:#bfb;"
| 1
| October 2
| Guangzhou Long-Lions
| 
| Jodie Meeks (19)
| Daniel Ochefu (7)
| Donald Sloan (7)
| Capital One ArenaN/A
| 1–0
|- style="background:#bfb;"
| 2
| October 6
| New York
| 
| John Wall (19)
| Jason Smith (8)
| John Wall (6)
| Capital One Arena11,899
| 2–0
|- style="background:#bfb;"
| 3
| October 8
| Cleveland
| 
| Felix, Meeks (13)
| Oubre Jr., Scott (5)
| Tomas Satoransky (5)
| Capital One Arena12,984
| 3–0
|- style="background:#fbb;"
| 4
| October 11
| @ Miami
| 
| John Wall (16)
| Kelly Oubre Jr. (14)
| John Wall (8)
| American Airlines Arena19,600
| 3–1
|- style="background:#bfb;"
| 5
| October 13
| @ New York
| 
| Bradley Beal (24)
| Kelly Oubre Jr. (8)
| Tomas Satoransky (5)
| Madison Square Garden16,461
| 4–1

Regular season

|- style="background:#cfc;"
| 1
| October 18
| Philadelphia
| 
| John Wall (28)
| Marcin Gortat (17)
| John Wall (8)
| Capital One Arena20,356
| 1–0
|- style="background:#cfc;"
| 2
| October 20
| Detroit
| 
| John Wall (26)
| Gortat, Porter Jr. (9)
| John Wall (10)
| Capital One Arena16,337
| 2–0
|- style="background:#cfc;"
| 3
| October 23
| @ Denver
| 
| Bradley Beal (20)
| Otto Porter Jr. (10)
| John Wall (12)
| Pepsi Center14,294
| 3–0
|- style="background:#fcc;"
| 4
| October 25
| @ LA Lakers
| 
| Bradley Beal (28)
| Marcin Gortat (14)
| John Wall (9)
| Staples Center18,996
| 3–1
|- style="background:#fcc;"
| 5
| October 27
| @ Golden State
| 
| Otto Porter (29)
| Otto Porter (10)
| John Wall (14)
| Oracle Arena19,596
| 3–2
|- style="background:#cfc;"
| 6
| October 29
| @ Sacramento
| 
| John Wall (19)
| Marcin Gortat (9)
| John Wall (9)
| Golden 1 Center17,583
| 4–2

|- style="background:#fcc;"
| 7
| November 1
| Phoenix
| 
| Bradley Beal (40)
| Marcin Gortat (13)
| John Wall (6)
| Capital One Arena14,790
| 4–3
|- style="background:#fcc;"
| 8
| November 3
| Cleveland
| 
| Bradley Beal (36)
| Oubre Jr., Wall (6)
| John Wall (15)
| Capital One Arena20,356
| 4–4
|- style="background:#cfc;"
| 9
| November 5
| @ Toronto
| 
| Bradley Beal (38)
| Marcin Gortat (12)
| Tim Frazier (8)
| Air Canada Centre19,800
| 5–4
|- style="background:#fcc;"
| 10
| November 7
| Dallas
| 
| Beal, Wall (23)
| Kelly Oubre Jr. (7)
| John Wall (14)
| Capital One Arena14,505
| 5–5
|- style="background:#cfc;"
| 11
| November 9
| LA Lakers
| 
| John Wall (23)
| Kelly Oubre Jr. (11)
| Beal, Frazier, Wall (5)
| Capital One Arena20,173
| 6–5
|- style="background:#cfc;"
| 12
| November 11
| Atlanta
| 
| Bradley Beal (19)
| Oubre Jr., Gortat (7)
| Frazier, Wall (5)
| Capital One Arena17,260
| 7–5
|- style="background:#cfc;"
| 13
| November 13
| Sacramento
| 
| John Wall (21)
| Ian Mahinmi (9)
| John Wall (9)
| Capital One Arena14,660
| 8–5
|- style="background:#cfc;"
| 14
| November 15
| @ Miami
| 
| John Wall (27)
| Kelly Oubre Jr. (13)
| John Wall (6)
| AmericanAirlines Arena19,600
| 9–5
|- style="background:#fcc;"
| 15
| November 17
| Miami
| 
| Bradley Beal (26)
| Marcin Gortat (13)
| John Wall (8)
| Capital One Arena17,551
| 9–6
|- style="background:#fcc;"
| 16
| November 19
| @ Toronto
| 
| Bradley Beal (27)
| Marcin Gortat (12)
| Tim Frazier (8)
| Air Canada Centre19,800
| 9–7
|- style="background:#cfc;"
| 17
| November 20
| @ Milwaukee
| 
| Bradley Beal (23)
| Marcin Gortat (12)
| John Wall (6)
| BMO Harris Bradley Center16,122
| 10–7
|- style="background:#fcc;"
| 18
| November 22
| @ Charlotte
| 
| John Wall (31)
| Marcin Gortat (11)
| John Wall (11)
| Spectrum Center16,041
| 10–8
|- style="background:#fcc;"
| 19
| November 25
| Portland
| 
| Bradley Beal (26)
| Otto Porter Jr. (10)
| Bradley Beal (7)
| Capital One Arena18,092
| 10–9
|- style="background:#cfc;"
| 20
| November 28
| @ Minnesota
| 
| Otto Porter Jr. (22)
| Porter Jr., Mahinmi (8)
| Beal, Satoransky (6)
| Target Center13,442
| 11–9
|- style="background:#fcc;"
| 21
| November 29
| @ Philadelphia
| 
| Kelly Oubre Jr. (22)
| Kelly Oubre Jr. (7)
| Tomas Satoransky (8)
| Wells Fargo Center20,492
| 11–10

|- style="background:#cfc;"
| 22
| December 1
| Detroit
| 
| Markieff Morris (23)
| Marcin Gortat (12)
| Tim Frazier (6)
| Capital One Arena17,885
| 12–10
|- style="background:#fcc;"
| 23
| December 4
| @ Utah
| 
| Otto Porter Jr. (14)
| Marcin Gortat (7)
| Marcin Gortat (3)
| Vivint Smart Home Arena17,227
| 12–11
|- style="background:#cfc;"
| 24
| December 5
| @ Portland
| 
| Bradley Beal (51)
| Otto Porter Jr. (10)
| Marcin Gortat (7)
| Moda Center19,241
| 13–11
|- style="background:#cfc;"
| 25
| December 7
| @ Phoenix
| 
| Bradley Beal (34)
| Gortat, Mahinmi (8)
| Tomas Satoransky (5)
| Talking Stick Resort Arena15,925
| 14–11
|-style="background:#fcc;"
| 26
| December 9
| @ LA Clippers
| 
| Otto Porter Jr. (27)
| Otto Porter Jr. (11)
| Frazier, Satoransky (6)
| Staples Center15,739
| 14–12
|-style="background:#fcc;"
| 27
| December 12
| @ Brooklyn
| 
| Bradley Beal (28)
| Gortat, Porter Jr. (11)
| Bradley Beal (4)
| Barclays Center14,515
| 14–13
|- style="background:#cfc;"
| 28
| December 13
| Memphis
| 
| Bradley Beal (18)
| Otto Porter Jr. (9)
| Bradley Beal (7)
| Capital One Arena15,297
| 15–13
|- style="background:#cfc;"
| 29
| December 15
| LA Clippers
| 
| Bradley Beal (20)
| Bradley Beal (11)
| John Wall (5)
| Capital One Arena15,442
| 16–13
|- style="background:#fcc;"
| 30
| December 17
| Cleveland
| 
| Bradley Beal (27)
| John Wall (10)
| John Wall (6)
| Capital One Arena20,356
| 16–14
|- style="background:#cfc;"
| 31
| December 19
| New Orleans
| 
| Bradley Beal (26)
| Marcin Gortat (14)
| John Wall (10)
| Capital One Arena16,529
| 17–14
|- style="background:#fcc;"
| 32
| December 22
| @ Brooklyn
| 
| Kelly Oubre Jr. (13)
| Jason Smith (6)
| Beal, Frazier (5)
| Barclays Center15,589
| 17–15
|- style="background:#cfc;"
| 33
| December 23
| Orlando
| 
| Mike Scott (18)
| Oubre Jr., Meeks (6)
| John Wall (13)
| Capital One Arena17,218
| 18–15
|- style="background:#cfc"
| 34
| December 25
| @ Boston
| 
| Bradley Beal (25)
| Marcin Gortat (10)
| John Wall (14)
| TD Garden18,624
| 19–15
|- style="background:#fcc"
| 35
| December 27
| @ Atlanta
| 
| Bradley Beal (20)
| Markieff Morris (8)
| John Wall (11)
| Philips Arena15,763
| 19–16
|- style="background:#cfc"
| 36
| December 29
| Houston
| 
| Beal, Oubre Jr. (21)
| Markieff Morris (9)
| Otto Porter Jr. (7)
| Capital One Arena20,356
| 20–16
|- style="background:#cfc;"
| 37
| December 31
| Chicago
| 
| Bradley Beal (39)
| Markieff Morris (11)
| Beal, Wall (9)
| Capital One Arena20,356
| 21–16

|- style="background:#cfc;"
| 38
| January 3
| New York
| 
| Bradley Beal (27)
| Markieff Morris (11)
| John Wall (9)
| Capital One Arena17,206
| 22–16
|- style="background:#cfc;"
| 39
| January 5
| @ Memphis
| 
| Bradley Beal (34)
| Markieff Morris (17)
| John Wall (9)
| FedExForum16,988
| 23–16
|- style="background:#fcc;"
| 40
| January 6
| Milwaukee
| 
| Bradley Beal (20)
| Markieff Morris (10)
| John Wall (16)
| Capital One Arena18,762
| 23–17
|- style="background:#fcc;"
| 41
| January 10
| Utah
| 
| John Wall (35)
| Marcin Gortat (8)
| John Wall (11)
| Capital One Arena15,640
| 23–18
|- style="background:#cfc;"
| 42
| January 12
| Orlando
| 
| Beal, Wall (30)
| Marcin Gortat (11)
| John Wall (9)
| Capital One Arena18,171
| 24–18
|- style="background:#cfc;"
| 43
| January 13
| Brooklyn
| 
| Bradley Beal (24)
| Marcin Gortat (13)
| John Wall (16)
| Capital One Arena18,354
| 25–18
|- style="background:#fcc;"
| 44
| January 15
| Milwaukee
| 
| John Wall (27)
| Marcin Gortat (7)
| John Wall (9)
| Capital One Arena19,607
| 25–19
|- style="background:#fcc;"
| 45
| January 17
| @ Charlotte
| 
| Bradley Beal (26)
| Marcin Gortat (8)
| John Wall (9)
| Spectrum Center11,528
| 25–20
|- style="background:#cfc;"
| 46
| January 19
| @ Detroit
| 
| Bradley Beal (26)
| Markieff Morris (9)
| John Wall (11)
| Little Caesars Arena14,744
| 26–20
|- style="background:#fcc;"
| 47
| January 22
| @ Dallas
| 
| Bradley Beal (18)
| Marcin Gortat (10)
| John Wall (5)
| American Airlines Center19,328
| 26–21
|- style="background:#fcc;"
| 48
| January 25
| @ Oklahoma City
| 
| Bradley Beal (41)
| Bradley Beal (12)
| John Wall (12)
| Chesapeake Energy Arena18,203
| 26–22
|- style="background:#cfc;"
| 49
| January 27
| @ Atlanta
| 
| Markieff Morris (23)
| Marcin Gortat (6)
| Tim Frazier (14)
| Philips Arena15,843
| 27–22
|- style="background:#cfc;"
| 50
| January 30
| Oklahoma City
| 
| Otto Porter Jr. (25)
| Marcin Gortat (7)
| Bradley Beal (9)
| Capital One Arena20,356
| 28–22

|- style="background:#cfc;"
| 51
| February 1
| Toronto
| 
| Bradley Beal (27)
| Otto Porter Jr. (11)
| Beal, Porter Jr. (6)
| Capital One Arena15,599
| 29–22
|- style="background:#cfc;"
| 52
| February 3
| @ Orlando
| 
| Otto Porter Jr. (20)
| Marcin Gortat (11)
| Bradley Beal (8)
| Amway Center18,846
| 30–22
|- style="background:#cfc;"
| 53
| February 5
| @ Indiana
| 
| Bradley Beal (21)
| Markieff Morris (10)
| Frazier, Satoransky (6)
| Bankers Life Fieldhouse13,169
| 31–22
|- style="background:#fcc;"
| 54
| February 6
| @ Philadelphia
| 
| Bradley Beal (30)
| Otto Porter Jr. (8)
| Bradley Beal (5)
| Wells Fargo Center20,530
| 31–23
|- style="background:#fcc;"
| 55
| February 8
| Boston
| 
| Otto Porter Jr. (27)
| Otto Porter Jr. (11)
| Bradley Beal (9)
| Capital One Arena20,536
| 31–24
|- style="background:#cfc;"
| 56
| February 10
| @ Chicago
| 
| Tomas Satoransky (25)
| Gortat, Porter Jr. (9)
| Beal, Satoransky (6)
| United Center21,112
| 32–24
|- style="background:#cfc;"
| 57
| February 14
| @ New York
| 
| Bradley Beal (36)
| Ian Mahinmi (8)
| Tomas Satoransky (11)
| Madison Square Garden19,812
| 33–24
|- style="background:#cfc;"
| 58
| February 22
| @ Cleveland
| 
| Bradley Beal (18)
| Morris, Porter Jr. (8)
| Bradley Beal (9)
| Quicken Loans Arena20,562
| 34–24
|- style="background:#fcc;"
| 59
| February 23
| Charlotte
| 
| Bradley Beal (33)
| Marcin Gortat (8)
| Markieff Morris (8)
| Capital One Arena17,824
| 34–25
|- style="background:#cfc;"
| 60
| February 25
| Philadelphia
| 
| Bradley Beal (24)
| Marcin Gortat (10)
| Tomas Satoransky (10)
| Capital One Arena17,180
| 35–25
|- style="background:#cfc;"
| 61
| February 27
| @ Milwaukee
| 
| Bradley Beal (21)
| Beal, Gortat, Porter Jr. (7)
| Bradley Beal (8)
| Bradley Center16,093
| 36–25
|- style="background:#fcc;"
| 62
| February 28
| Golden State
| 
| Otto Porter Jr. (29)
| Otto Porter Jr. (10)
| Bradley Beal (5)
| Capital One Arena20,356
| 36–26

|- style="background:#fcc;"
| 63
| March 2
| Toronto
| 
| Otto Porter Jr. (24)
| Marcin Gortat (8)
| Tomas Satoransky (8)
| Capital One Arena18,631
| 36–27
|- style="background:#fcc;"
| 64
| March 4
| Indiana
| 
| Bradley Beal (22)
| Ian Mahinmi (9)
| Bradley Beal (11)
| Capital One Arena16,646
| 36–28
|- style="background:#cfc;"
| 65
| March 6
| Miami
| 
| Bradley Beal (30)
| Markieff Morris (13)
| Beal, Satoransky (7)
| Capital One Arena16,582
| 37–28
|- style="background:#cfc;"
| 66
| March 9
| @ New Orleans
| 
| Otto Porter Jr. (19)
| Marcin Gortat (8)
| Bradley Beal (9)
| Smoothie King Center18,143
| 38–28
|- style="background:#fcc;"
| 67
| March 10
| @ Miami
| 
| Jodie Meeks (23)
| Kelly Oubre Jr. (6)
| Tim Frazier (6)
| American Airlines Arena19,600
| 38–29
|- style="background:#fcc;"
| 68
| March 13
| Minnesota
| 
| Bradley Beal (19)
| Ian Mahinmi (9)
| Tomas Satoransky (7)
| Capital One Arena17,078
| 38–30
|- style="background:#cfc;"
| 69
| March 14
| @ Boston
| 
| Bradley Beal (34)
| Mahinmi, Porter Jr. (11)
| Bradley Beal (9)
| TD Garden18,624
| 39–30
|- style="background:#cfc;"
| 70
| March 17
| Indiana
| 
| Bradley Beal (19)
| Marcin Gortat (8)
| Tomas Satoransky (8)
| Capital One Arena18,249
| 40–30
|- style="background:#fcc;"
| 71
| March 21
| @ San Antonio
| 
| Bradley Beal (21)
| Otto Porter Jr. (7)
| Tomas Satoransky (6)
| AT&T Center18,418
| 40–31
|- style="background:#fcc;"
| 72
| March 23
| Denver
| 
| Bradley Beal (24)
| Markieff Morris (8)
| Tomas Satoransky (6)
| Capital One Arena19,016
| 40–32
|- style="background:#fcc;"
| 73
| March 25
| NY Knicks
| 
| Bradley Beal (14)
| Otto Porter Jr. (10)
| Tomas Satoransky (10)
| Capital One Arena18,884
| 40–33
|- style="background:#cfc;"
| 74
| March 27
| San Antonio
| 
| Markieff Morris (15)
| Kelly Oubre Jr. (9)
| Beal, Sessions (6)
| Capital One Arena19,588
| 41–33
|- style="background:#fcc;"
| 75
| March 29
| @ Detroit
| 
| Bradley Beal (15)
| Marcin Gortat (12)
| Tomas Satoransky (6)
| Little Caesars Arena18,268
| 41–34
|- style="background:#cfc;"
| 76
| March 31
| Charlotte
| 
| Otto Porter Jr. (26)
| Otto Porter Jr. (11)
| John Wall (14)
| Capital One Arena19,071
| 42–34

|- style="background:#fcc;"
| 77
| April 1
| @ Chicago
| 
| Otto Porter Jr. (17)
| Marcin Gortat (7)
| Bradley Beal (6)
| United Center20,466
| 42–35
|- style="background:#fcc;"
| 78
| April 3
| @ Houston
| 
| Bradley Beal (27)
| Markieff Morris (6)
| John Wall (9)
| Toyota Center18,055
| 42–36
|- style="background:#fcc;"
| 79
| April 5
| @ Cleveland
| 
| John Wall (28)
| Bradley Beal (9)
| John Wall (14)
| Quicken Loans Arena20,562
| 42–37
|- style="background:#fcc;"
| 80
| April 6
| Atlanta
| 
| Bradley Beal (32)
| Marcin Gortat (11)
| Marcin Gortat (4)
| Capital One Arena19,557
| 42–38
|- style="background:#cfc;"
| 81
| April 10
| Boston
| 
| John Wall (29)
| Scott, Mahinmi (8)
| John Wall (11)
| Capital One Arena18,887
| 43–38
|- style="background:#fcc;"
| 82
| April 11
| @ Orlando
| 
| Jodie Meeks (18)
| Marcin Gortat (10)
| Beal, Satoranský (4)
| Amway Center17,598
| 43–39

Playoffs

|- style="background:#fcc;"
| 1
| April 14
| @ Toronto
| 
| John Wall (21)
| Markieff Morris (11)
| John Wall (15)
| Air Canada Centre19,937
| 0–1
|- style="background:#fcc;"
| 2
| April 17
| @ Toronto
| 
| John Wall (29)
| Kelly Oubre Jr. (5)
| John Wall (9)
| Air Canada Centre20,242
| 0–2
|- style="background:#cfc;"
| 3
| April 20
|  Toronto
| 
| Wall, Beal (28)
| Otto Porter Jr. (8)
| John Wall (14)
| Capital One Arena20,356
| 1–2
|- style="background:#cfc;"
| 4
| April 22
| Toronto
| 
| Bradley Beal (31)
| Gortat, Porter Jr., Wall (6)
| John Wall (14)
| Capital One Arena20,356
| 2–2
|- style="background:#fcc;"
| 5
| April 25
| @ Toronto
| 
| John Wall (26)
| Marcin Gortat (12)
| John Wall (9)
| Air Canada Centre19,987
| 2–3
|- style="background:#fcc;"
| 6
| April 27
| Toronto
| 
| Bradley Beal (32)
| Markieff Morris (15)
| John Wall (8)
| Capital One Arena20,356
| 2–4

Transactions

Trades

Free Agents

Re-signed

Additions

Subtractions

References

Washington Wizards seasons
Washington Wizards
Washington Wizards
Washington Wizards